The Hagmann Free-Flow Valve is a trademarked brass instrument valve design developed by Swiss musician and instrument technician René Hagmann, first introduced for trombone F attachments in 1990. His intention was to address some of the geometrical limitations of the regular rotary valve, as well as the reliability and maintenance issues of the popular Thayer axial flow valve that arise from its relatively complex design.

A standard rotary valve turns the air flow as much as 90 degrees when it is engaged. This does not substantially affect the sound of instruments like the French Horn which already have many turns in the air flow, but part of the characteristic sound of the trombone comes from its long, straight air flow. The angles on a Hagmann valve are dramatically less (60 to 66 degrees) which makes it much easier for the player to maintain proper tone with the valve engaged. While the Hagmann Valve does not achieve as low an angle as the Thayer Valve (which can be as low as 20 degrees), it is much easier to maintain and the tone differences are nearly inaudible.

Hagmann valves are available on trombones from several manufacturers, especially on their professional ranges, including Bach, Courtois, Haag, Rath, S.E. Shires, Schagerl, and Thein.

In 2004 Haag released a cimbasso in F built with five Hagmann valves. This instrument is used by several operas and orchestras, including Badische Staatskapelle, Hungarian State Opera, and Sydney Symphony Orchestra.

References

External links 
 Inventor's website 

Brass instrument parts and accessories
Air valves